Tahiri may refer to:

Bandar Siraf, also known as Tahiri, a city in Iran
Dashamir Tahiri, Albanian politician
Dodë Tahiri (1915–1988), Albanian footballer
Edita Tahiri (born 1956), Kosovan politician
Ermal Tahiri (born 1969), Albanian footballer
Tahiri Veila, a Star Wars Legends character

See also
Taheri (disambiguation)
Táhirih

Albanian-language surnames